The 2017 Collingwood Football Club season was the club's 121st season of senior competition in the Australian Football League (AFL). The club also fielded its reserves team in the VFL, and a women's team in the inaugural AFL Women's competition.

Squad

 Players are listed by guernsey number, and 2017 statistics are for AFL regular season and finals series matches during the 2017 AFL season only. Career statistics include a player's complete AFL career, which, as a result, means that a player's debut and part or whole of their career statistics may be for another club. Statistics are correct as of Round 23 of the 2017 season (26 August 2017) and are taken from AFL Tables. Please note that this squad refers to AFL-listed players at the club. An additional 24 players not listed here are signed by the club as VFL-listed players, meaning they can only play for the club's seconds team.

Squad changes

In

Out

AFL season

Pre-season matches

Regular season

Ladder

Awards & Milestones

AFL Award Nominations
 Round 3 – 2017 AFL Goal of the Year nomination – Adam Treloar
 Round 8 – 2017 AFL Goal of the Year nomination – Steele Sidebottom
 Round 8 – 2017 AFL Mark of the Year nomination – Jeremy Howe
 Round 9 – 2017 AFL Rising Star nomination – Tom Phillips
 Round 11 – 2017 AFL Mark of the Year nomination – Jeremy Howe
 Round 12 – 2017 AFL Mark of the Year nomination – Jeremy Howe
 Round 14 – 2017 AFL Mark of the Year nomination – Brodie Grundy
 Round 23 – 2017 AFL Goal of the Year nomination – Jamie Elliott
 Round 23 – 2017 AFL Mark of the Year nomination – Jeremy Howe
 2017 All-Australian team 40-man squad – Jeremy Howe, Adam Treloar

Club Awards
  – Steele Sidebottom
  – Taylor Adams
  – Adam Treloar
  – Jeremy Howe
  – Brodie Grundy
  – Marty Hore
  – Tyson Goldsack
  – Callum Brown
  – Jamie Elliott

Milestones
 Round 1 – Will Hoskin-Elliott (Collingwood debut)
 Round 1 – Chris Mayne (Collingwood debut)
 Round 1 – Henry Schade (Collingwood debut)
 Round 1 – Tyson Goldsack (50 goals)
 Round 5 – Daniel Wells (Collingwood debut)
 Round 6 – Lynden Dunn (Collingwood debut)
 Round 6 – Taylor Adams (50 Collingwood games)
 Round 6 – Jack Crisp (50 Collingwood games)
 Round 6 – Will Hoskin-Elliott (50 AFL goals)
 Round 9 – Tyson Goldsack (150 games)
 Round 9 – James Aish (50 AFL games)
 Round 9 – Levi Greenwood (50 AFL goals)
 Round 12 – Callum Brown (AFL debut)
 Round 14 – Darcy Moore (50 goals)
 Round 15 – Scott Pendlebury (250 games)
 Round 16 – Collingwood's 2500th VFL/AFL game
 Round 16 – Tom Langdon (50 games)
 Round 17 – Daniel Wells (250 AFL games)
 Round 17 – Jarryd Blair (150 games)
 Round 21 – Alex Fasolo (100 games)
 Round 21 – Jordan De Goey (50 games)
 Round 21 – Ben Reid (50 goals)
 Round 22 – Josh Daicos (AFL debut)
 Round 22 – Brayden Maynard (50 games)
 Round 23 – Kayle Kirby (AFL debut)

VFL season

Pre-season matches

Regular season

Finals series

Ladder

Women's season

Regular season

Ladder

Squad
 Players are listed by guernsey number, and 2017 statistics are for AFL Women's regular season and finals series matches during the 2017 AFL Women's season only. Career statistics include a player's complete AFL Women's career, which, as a result, means that a player's debut and part or whole of their career statistics may be for another club. Statistics are correct as of Round 7 of the 2017 season (19 March 2017) and are taken from Australian Football.

League awards
 Rising Star nomination – Brittany Bonnici – Round 6

Club Awards
 Best and fairest – Nicola Stevens 
 Leading goalkicker – Moana Hope (7 goals)

Notes
 Key
 H ^ Home match.
 A ^ Away match.

 Notes
Collingwood's scores are indicated in bold font.

References

External links
 Official website of the Collingwood Football Club
 Official website of the Australian Football League

2017
Collingwood Football Club
Collingwood